This list of prostitutes and courtesans includes famous persons who have engaged in prostitution and courtesan work.

Historical

Ancient world
Rahab of Jericho
Aspasia, Greek hetaera, companion of Pericles
Phryne, Greek hetaera
Thaïs, Greek hetaera who lived during the time of Alexander the Great
Theodora, empress of Byzantium
Su Xiaoxiao, Chinese courtesan of the 5th century

Early Modern era

Imperia Cognati, the "first courtesan" in Europe
Isabella de Luna, Italian (originally Spanish) courtesan of Renaissance-era Rome.
Hwang Jini, the most famous Korean gisaeng
Chica da Silva, famous eighteenth-century slave courtesan in Brazil, subject of the movie Xica
Madame du Barry, mistress to Louis XV of France
Veronica Franco, Venetian courtesan and poet
Nell Gwyn, courtesan to Charles II of England

19th century
Laura Bell, the "Queen of London whoredom"
Theresa Berkeley, dominatrix
Jeanne Brécourt, born 1837, one of France's most notorious courtesans 
Annie Chapman, one of the "canonical five" victims of Jack the Ripper
Mary Jane Kelly, one of the "canonical five" victims of Jack the Ripper
Lizzie Lape, mid-Ohio madam, operator of multiple bordellos, 1880s-1900s
Mary Ann Nichols, one of the "canonical five" victims of Jack the Ripper
Shady Sadie (Josephine Marcus), courtesan who had an affair with Wyatt Earp
Elizabeth Stride, one of the "canonical five" victims of Jack the Ripper
Martha Tabram, a possible victim of Jack the Ripper
Libby Thompson, "Squirrel Tooth Alice," madam of a brothel in Sweetwater, Texas
 Julia Bulette, American prostitute in Virginia City, Nevada

20th century
Elizabeth Adams, (1933 or 1934–July 8, 1995), also known as Madam Alex, Hollywood madam
Polly Adler, New York madam, 1920s to 1940s
Air Force Amy, a legal prostitute in Nevada, pornographic actress, and adult model, who starred in the HBO television documentary series Cathouse: The Series. MSNBC has called her "a living legend in the world of sex."
Josie Arlington, madam in Storyville, New Orleans
Caridad la Negra (María de la Caridad Norberta Pacheco Sánchez) Spanish prostitute and madam, early to mid-20th century
Suzy Favor-Hamilton, 3 time Olympian for Track and Field, and the subject of intense publicity when her activities as an escort became public.
Heidi Fleiss, a.k.a. the "Hollywood Madam", ran an upscale prostitution ring based in Los Angeles during the 1990s
Mata Hari (born Margaretha Geertruida Zelle), Dutch spy
Xaviera Hollander, author of the memoir The Happy Hooker: My Own Story
La Macorina, Cuban courtesan, 1910s to 1930s
Carol Leigh, a.k.a. Scarlot Harlot, coined the term "sex worker"
Brooke Magnanti, blogger and scientist who wrote as Belle de Jour and was the inspiration for Billie Piper's character in Secret Diary of a Call Girl
Barbara Payton, American actress turned prostitute 
Charlotte Rose, an English sex worker, dominatrix, sexual trainer and political candidate
Annie Sprinkle, American sex worker, porn star, and sex educator and writer
Valérie Tasso, French author
Sheila Vogel-Coupe, at 85+ the oldest prostitute in the United Kingdom and, possibly, the world
Gangubai Harjeevandas, a prostitute, an Indian social activist and madam of a brothel in the Kamathipura area of Mumbai during the 1960s
Clara Ward, Princesse de Caraman-Chimay, daughter of a Michigan lumberman who spent most of her life in Europe
Lulu White, madam in Storyville, New Orleans
Estella Marie Thompson, also known as Divine Brown, an American and former prostitute who gained public attention in 1995 when actor Hugh Grant was caught receiving oral sex from her in his car
Kimberly Daniels, former sex worker and drug addict who became a prolific author, religious minister and member of the Florida House of Representatives; introduced successful legislation to put In God we trust in Florida school classrooms
Domenica Niehoff, German prostitute, dominatrix, sex worker rights activist and television personality
Molly Luft, German prostitute, brothel owner and television personality

21st century

Liara Roux, American prostitute, sex worker rights activist and author in New York
Sexy Cora, German former prostitute, pornographic actress and reality show participant

Fictional

In literature
Angel/Sarah, Lucky, & Mai Ling, in Redeeming Love by Francine Rivers
Bella Cohen, Florry, & Zoe, in Ulysses by James Joyce
Belle, Ah, Wilderness! by Eugene O'Neill
Belle Watling, Gone with the Wind by Margaret Mitchell
Betsi, a female Whiphid, Star Wars: X-wing (book series) by Michael A. Stackpole.
Candy, in Candy: A Novel of Love and Addiction by Luke Davies
Candy, in One Flew Over the Cuckoo's Nest by Ken Kesey
Chandramukhi, in Devdas by Sarat Chandra Chattopadhyay
Eccentrica Gallumbits, "The Triple-Breasted Whore of Eroticon Six" in The Hitchhiker's Guide to the Galaxy by Douglas Adams
Elisabeth Rouset, in "Boule de Suif", a short story by Guy de Maupassant
Fanny Hill, in Fanny Hill by John Cleland
Fantine, in Les Misérables by Victor Hugo

Marguerite Gautier, from Alexandre Dumas, fils' work La Dame aux camélias, inspired by real life 19th-century courtesan Marie Duplessis, 
Jenny Smith, in Kurt Weill's Rise and Fall of the City of Mahagonny and The Threepenny Opera
Juliette, in the Marquis de Sade's Juliette
Kamala, in Siddhartha by Hermann Hesse
Lady Sally, in Callahan's Lady by Spider Robinson
Lozana, Portrait of Lozana by Francisco Delicado
Lulu, in Frank Wedekind's plays and Alban Berg's opera of the same name
Mamie Stover, The Revolt of Mamie Stover by William Bradford Huie
Manon Lescaut
Mistress Overdone, manager of a bordello in Measure for Measure by William Shakespeare
Moll Flanders, The Fortunes and Misfortunes of the Famous Moll Flanders by Daniel Defoe
Molly Malone, Irish urban legend
Mother Goose, in Stravinsky's The Rake's Progress
Nana, Nana, by Émile Zola
Nancy, Oliver Twist by Charles Dickens
Odette, in Marcel Proust's Un amour de Swann
Phedre no Delauny of Jacqueline Carey's Kushiel novels
Pie 'Oh' Pah, from Imajica by Clive Barker
Romulus, central character in The Romanian: Story of an Obsession by Bruce Benderson
Mrs. Rosie Palm, brothel owner and president of the Guild of "Seamstresses" in various Discworld novels by Terry Pratchett
Satine, in Moulin Rouge! by Baz Luhrmann, a story based on the Paris nightclub of the same name
Séverine Serizy, in the 1928 novel Belle de Jour and the 1967 film based on it
Sonya Marmeladova, Crime and Punishment by Fyodor Dostoyevsky
Suzie Wong, from The World of Suzie Wong by Richard Mason
Talanta, La Talanta by Pietro Aretino
Thúy Kiều, The Tale of Kieu by Nguyễn Du
Tra La La, Last Exit to Brooklyn by Hubert Selby
Tristessa, Tristessa by Jack Kerouac
Vasantsenaa, a Nagarvadhu, or wealthy courtesan, in Śudraka's Sanskrit play Mṛcchakatika
Violetta, main character from the opera La Traviata by Giuseppe Verdi, is also inspired by Alexandre Dumas' La Dame aux camélias. "La Traviata" means "the reprobate".
Yumi Komagata, in Rurouni Kenshin by Nobuhiro Watsuki
Zaza, in Zaza by Pierre Berton and

Film, television, and musical theater
Belle the Sleeping Car, train in Starlight Express by Andrew Lloyd Webber
Christine/Chelsea, central character in The Girlfriend Experience
Inara Serra, Firefly by Joss Whedon
Ai Nu in Intimate Confessions of a Chinese Courtesan (1972) by Chor Yuen (Hong Kong) (Mandarin) (Action, Drama)
Bree Daniels (Jane Fonda) in Klute (1971) by Alan J. Pakula (USA) (English) (Crime, Mystery, Thriller)
Cabiria (Giulietta Masina) in Nights of Cabiria (1957) by Federico Fellini (Italy, France) (Italian) (Drama)
Chandramukhi (Vyjayanthimala and Madhuri Dixit) in Devdas (1955) by Bimal Roy and Devdas (2002) by Sanjay Leela Bhansali respectively (India) (Hindi, Urdu, Bengali) (Drama, Musical, Romance); from novella by Saratchandra Chatterjee
Chiyo Sakamoto (Ziyi Zhang) in Memoirs of a Geisha (2005) by Rob Marshall (USA) (English, Japanese) (Drama, Romance); from novel by Arthur Golden
Claire Reine / Garance (Arletty) in Children of Paradise (1945) by Marcel Carné (France) (French) (Drama, Romance)
Constance Miller (Julie Christie) in McCabe & Mrs. Miller (1971) by Robert Altman (USA) (English) (Drama, Western); from novel by Edmund Naughton
Doris (Barbra Streisand) in The Owl and the Pussycat (1970) by Herbert Ross (USA) (English) (Comedy, Romance); from play by Bill Manhoff
Eréndira (Claudia Ohana) in Eréndira (1983) by Ruy Guerra (France, Mexico, West Germany) (Portuguese, Spanish) (Drama); from novel by Gabriel García Márquez
Fanny Hill (Letícia Román) in Fanny Hill (1964) by Russ Meyer (USA, West Germany) (English, German) (Comedy); from novel by John Cleland
Fleur (Anita Mui) in Rouge (1988) by Stanley Kwan (Hong Kong) (Cantonese) (Drama, Fantasy, Music, Mystery, Romance); from novel by Lilian Lee
Gigi (Leslie Caron) in Gigi (1958) by Vincente Minnelli (USA) (English, French); from novella by Colette
Gloria Wandrous (Elizabeth Taylor) in BUtterfield 8 (1960) by Daniel Mann (USA) (English) (Drama); from novel by John O'Hara
Hattie (Susan Sarandon) in Pretty Baby (1978) by Louis Malle (USA) (English) (Drama)
Ilya (Melina Mercouri) in Never on Sunday (1960) by Jules Dassin (Greece, USA) (English, Greek, Russian) (Comedy, Drama, Romance)
Iris (Jodie Foster) in Taxi Driver (1976) by Martin Scorsese (USA) (English, Spanish) (Crime, Drama)
Irma La Douce (Shirley MacLaine) in Irma la Douce (1963) by Billy Wilder (USA) (English) (Comedy, Romance); from play by Alexandre Breffort
Isabelle (Marine Vacth) in Young & Beautiful (2013) by François Ozon (France) (French, German) (Drama, Romance)
Juxian (Gong Li), courtesan and prostitute at an upscale brothel before marrying Duan Xiaolou in the book and film Farewell My Concubine 
Liz (Theresa Russell) in Whore (1991) by Ken Russell (USA) (USA, UK) (Drama); from play by David Hines
Lorena Wood (Diane Lane) in Lonesome Dove (1989) by Simon Wincer (USA) (English) (Adventure, Drama, Western); from novel by Larry McMurtry
Lynn Bracken (Kim Basinger) in L.A. Confidential (1997) by Curtis Hanson (USA) (English) (Crime, Drama, Mystery, Thriller); from novel by James Ellroy
Marguerite Gautier (Greta Garbo) in Camille (1936) by George Cukor (USA) (English) (Drama, Romance); from novel & play by Alexandre Dumas
Maya (Indira Varma) in Kama Sutra: A Tale of Love (1997) by Mira Nair (USA, India, UK, Japan, Germany) (English, Italian) (Crime, Drama, History, Romance)
Nana (Catherine Hessling) in Nana (1926) by Jean Renoir (France) (French) (Drama, Romance); from novel by Émile Zola
Ophelia (Jamie Lee Curtis) in the comedy film Trading Places (1983)
Otsuya (Ayako Wakao) in Irezumi (1966) by Yasuzō Masumura (Japan) (Japanese) (Drama); from novel by Jun'ichirō Tanizaki
Sahibjaan (Meena Kumari) in Pakeezah (1972) by Kamal Amrohi (India) (Urdu) (Musical, Romance, Drama)
Satine (Nicole Kidman) in Moulin Rouge! (2001) by Baz Luhrmann (Australia, USA) (English, French, Spanish) (Drama, Musical, Romance)
Satsu Sakamoto (Samantha Futerman), sister of Chiyo, who was not allowed to join the Geisha house and ended up in a brothel, instead. From the book and movie Memoirs of a Geisha.
Seol-ji (Kim Ok-bin) in The Accidental Gangster and the Mistaken Courtesan (2008) by Yeo Kyun-dong (South Korea) (Korean) (Action, Adventure, Comedy)
Séverine Serizy (Catherine Deneuve) in Belle de Jour (1967) by Luis Buñuel (France, Italy) (French, Spanish) (Drama); from novel by Joseph Kessel
Suzie Wong (Nancy Kwan) in The World of Suzie Wong (1960) by Richard Quine (UK, USA) (English, Cantonese) (Drama, Romance); from novel by Richard Mason
Tereza Batista (Patrícia França) in Tereza Batista: Home from the Wars (1992) by Paulo Afonso Grisolli (Brazil) (Portuguese) (Drama); from novel by Jorge Amado
Umrao Jaan (Aishwarya Rai Bachchan) in Umrao Jaan (2006) by J.P. Dutta (India) (Urdu, Hindi) (Drama, Romance); from novel by Mirza Haadi Ruswa
Veronica Franco (Catherine McCormack) in Dangerous Beauty (1998) by Marshall Herskovitz (USA) (English) (Biography, Drama, Romance); from biography by Margaret Rosenthal
Violet (Brooke Shields) in Pretty Baby (1978) by Louis Malle (USA) (English) (Drama)
Vivian Ward (Julia Roberts) in Pretty Woman (1990) by Garry Marshall (USA) (English) (Comedy, Romance)
Zoe (Julie Delpy) in Killing Zoe (1993) by Roger Avary (France, USA) (English, French) (Crime, Thriller)
Blanche Simmons (Louise Jameson), Dorothy Bennett (Veronica Roberts) and Maggie Thorpe (Lizzie Mickery) in Tenko are all to some degree prostitutes. Maggie is intended to be a replacement for Blanche as by the 3rd series of Tenko, Blanche dies offscreen as a result of beri-beri.

Symbolic or allegorical prostitutes
The Whore of Babylon
Oholah and Oholibah
Moll Hackabout, the prostitute in The Harlot's Progress by William Hogarth

Myth and legend
Agatha - English prostitute, mother of Mother Shipton
Basileia (Ancient Greece) - in Pandemos, this goddess was mainly a goddess for prostitutes or courtesans
Bebhinn (Celts of the British Isles) - the goddess of pleasure
Gomer, a prostitute whom God commanded Hosea to marry in the biblical Book of Hosea
Naamah (Hebrews) - an angel of prostitution, one of the succubus mates of the demon Samael in Zoharistic Qabalah
Rahab, Biblical prostitute who assisted the Hebrews in capturing Jericho
Shamhat (Sumer/Babylon) 
Xochiquetzal (Aztecs) - the goddess of prostitutes, pregnant women, & dancing
Alexandra Dé Broussehan (Irish Celts) - a woman turned spirit of prostitution, caused a war between the Callahan and Lawlor Clans, and often associated with Korrigan whose worship involved sacred prostitution

See also
 Index of prostitute articles

References

Bibliography 
 Quan, Tracy. Opera, in Melissa Ditmore (ed.), Encyclopedia of Prostitution and Sex Work 2006

Prostitutes and courtesans
Prostitutes and courtesans
Prostitutes and courtesans